500 Queer Scientists is a visibility campaign for LGBTQ+ people working in the sciences. Queer scientists submit short descriptions of their lives to the organization; these are manually checked and proof-read before being posted to the group's website. In collating submissions, the organization intends to show queer people currently working in science that there are others like them, to provide role models for future generations of researchers, and to create a database that can be used when planning events to ensure representation.

History 
The group was founded in San Francisco on 4 June 2018, by Lauren Esposito, an arachnology professor at the California Academy of Sciences and Sean Vidal Edgerton, a science illustrator and evolutionary virologist at the academy. In the press release announcing its foundation, the organization referenced, as part of its motivation, a 2016 paper in the Journal of Homosexuality that found that, in 2013, more than 40% of respondents to a survey who identified as LGBTQ+ had not revealed that they were to their colleagues.  The campaign was inspired by the group 500 Women Scientists; the two groups are separate, but consider themselves to be "informally partnered".  At launch, the site contained 50 scientists' stories; within a week this had reached 250, and by 26 June there were 550.  The first stories were all written in English.

In June 2019, they held an event with publisher Elsevier to mark World Pride.  The site had over 900 profiles by July 2019; in that month, the group was involved in organizing the second LGBTSTEM Day.

Recognition 
For founding 500 Queer Scientists, the National Organization of Gay and Lesbian Scientists and Technical Professionals awarded the 2019 Walt Westman Award to Lauren Esposito.

Notable people included 

 David Adger
 Clara Barker
 Cynthia Bauerle
 Alex Bond
 Ben Britton
 Peter Coles
 Lynn Conway
 Rochelle Diamond
 JJ Eldridge
 Lauren Esposito
 Michael Francis Fay
 Jon Freeman
 Sam Giles
 Abhik Ghosh
 Lisa Graumlich
 Renée Hložek
 J. David Jentsch
 Autumn Kent
 Nathan H. Lents
 Katie Mack
 Anson W. Mackay
 Jessica Mink
 Shaun O'Boyle
 Jonathon Rendina
 David K. Smith
 Jessica Ware
 Tristram Wyatt
 Jeremy Yoder

See also 

 LGBT people in science
500 Women Scientists

References

External links 

 500 Queer Scientists

2018 establishments in the United States
LGBT organizations in the United States
Science advocacy organizations
Sexual orientation and science
Organizations for LGBT science